Real Animal is a studio album by Alejandro Escovedo, released in 2008. It was produced by Tony Visconti, and co-written with Chuck Prophet.

Track listing
All tracks composed by Alejandro Escovedo and Chuck Prophet
"Always a Friend" – 3:35
"Chelsea Hotel '78" – 3:30
"Sister Lost Soul" – 4:16
"Smoke" – 4:23
"Sensitive Boys" – 4:29
"People (We're Only Gonna Live So Long)" – 3:21
"Golden Bear" – 3:58
"Nuns Song" – 4:50
"Real As An Animal" – 3:05
"Hollywood Hills" – 3:42
"Swallows of San  Juan" – 4:06
"Chip N' Tony" - 3:10
"Slow Down" - 4:09

Personnel

Alejandro Escovedo - Primary Artist, Guitar, Harmonica, Vocals 
Chuck Prophet - Guitar, Background Vocals 
Susan Voelz - Violin, Background Vocals 
Tony Visconti - Organ, Background Vocals 
Hector Muñoz - Percussion, Drums, Background Vocals 
Josh Gravelin - Bass, Keyboards, Background Vocals 
Brian Standefer - Cello, Background Vocals 
David Pulkingham - Guitar, Keyboards, Background Vocals 
Brad Grable - Baritone Saxophone, Tenor Saxophone
Strings arranged by Brian Standefer, Susan Voelz, Tony Visconti

References

Alejandro Escovedo albums
2008 albums
Albums produced by Tony Visconti